Karsten Hansen is a Faroese politician who has served in various ministerial positions.

Political career
Hansen first served as Minister of Finance from 15 May 1998 until 6 June 2002 as a member of Republic. He was reappointed and served in the position until 3 February 2004.
On 4 February 2008, he was again appointed Minister of Finance. He served in the position until 26 September 2008.

In November 2011, as a member of the Centre Party, he was appointed Minister of Health Affairs.

References

Living people
Finance Ministers of the Faroe Islands
Health ministers of the Faroe Islands
Year of birth missing (living people)